A by-election was held for the New South Wales Legislative Assembly electorate of Maitland on 28 October 1911, following the death of John Gillies.

Dates

Result

John Gillies died.

See also
Electoral results for the district of Maitland
List of New South Wales state by-elections

Notes

References

1911 elections in Australia
New South Wales state by-elections
1910s in New South Wales
October 1911 events